Ned Myers (born 1793) was an American sailor. Born in Quebec as a British subject, Myers grew up in Halifax after being abandoned by his father. He moved to New York City at the age of eleven, cherishing the dream of becoming a sailor. Two years later, while serving aboard the merchant ship Sterling, Myers would meet James Fenimore Cooper, who would later write a biography of him titled Ned Myers, or, a Life Before the Mast (1843). Myers rejected his status as a British subject and became an American citizen, something that would cause him trouble when he was captured by a Royal Navy warship in the summer of 1812. However, Myers would live through the War of 1812, meeting with Cooper in 1843 for the authoring of his biography.

References

Sources

Further reading

1793 births
American sailors
Year of death missing